Rodrigo López Alvarez (born May 10, 1987) is a professional soccer player who plays as a midfielder for USL Championship club Sacramento Republic. Born in Mexico, he represented the United States national under-20 team.

Career

Youth
López grew up in Santa Barbara, California, and began his career in 2003 when he joined the Chivas de Guadalajara youth system, where he played for a year and a half.

Professional
López turned professional when he was signed to a developmental contract by Chivas USA on July 7, 2005, and remained with the team until he was waived in 2007 having made eight MLS appearances.

López dropped down a level to play a season with Ventura County Fusion in the USL Premier Development League in 2008, and then played for both Cuervos Negros de Zapotlanejo and Querétaro in Mexico, before returning to Ventura County in the summer of 2009 to help the Fusion win the 2009 PDL Championship, receiving MVP honors.

Following the conclusion of the PDL season López signed with the Portland Timbers, helping them to the 2009 USL First Division regular season title.

On March 17, 2011, Lopez was added to the Portland Timbers MLS roster, along with Chris Taylor and Spencer Thompson. Following the 2011 season, the Timbers announced that they would not be bringing López back for the 2012 season. Lopez entered the 2011 MLS Re-Entry Draft but was not selected and became a free agent.

On December 2, 2013, Sacramento Republic FC of USL Pro announced López as their first signing. Was a USL PRO MVP finalist and a First Team All-USL PRO Selection. Was named to the USL PRO Team of the Week in weeks 9, 14, 19 and 24 and was the Player of the Week in week 14. Was also named USL PRO Playoffs MVP.

On October 8, 2015, López announced that he would not be returning for Sacramento Republic FC's 2016 season.

On January 3, 2020 Sacramento Republic FC announced the return of López for the 2020 season.

Following his release from Sacramento at the end of the 2020 season, López moved to Rio Grande Valley FC on April 15, 2021. On January 18, 2022, López was transferred back to Sacramento Republic.

Following the 2022 U.S. Open Cup, he was named Player of the Tournament.

Personal
Although born in Mexico, López's family moved to the United States when he was two years old, and he holds dual-citizenship with Mexico and the United States. He also has a brother and sister, Carmen López and Álvaro López.

Honors
Ventura County Fusion
USL Premier Development League Champions: 2009

Orlando City
USL Professional Division Commissioner's Cup: 2012

Sacramento Republic
USL Cup: 2014

Individual
USL Championship All League First Team (2): 2014, 2022
USL Championship All League Second Team: 2015

References

External links
 
 

1987 births
Living people
American soccer players
American sportspeople of Mexican descent
Association football midfielders
Chivas USA players
Footballers from Jalisco
Major League Soccer players
Mexican emigrants to the United States
Orange County SC players
Orlando City SC (2010–2014) players
People from Harbor City, Los Angeles
Portland Timbers players
Portland Timbers (2001–2010) players
Querétaro F.C. footballers
Sacramento Republic FC players
C.D. Veracruz footballers
Soccer players from California
United States men's under-20 international soccer players
United States men's youth international soccer players
USL Championship players
USL First Division players
USL League Two players
USSF Division 2 Professional League players
Ventura County Fusion players
Rio Grande Valley FC Toros players
Mexican footballers